The XXIst Central American and Caribbean Games were held in Mayagüez, Puerto Rico from July 17, 2010 to August 1, 2010.

Results by event

Bowling

The women's singles Final for the bowling event took place on 19 July at 8:00 (UTC−04:00), three Honduran athletes participated in this event finishing 7th, 47th and 70th from 72 participants.

The men's singles Final for the bowling event took place on 19 July at 17:00 (UTC−04:00), four Honduran athletes participated in this event finishing 41st, 48th, 66th and 71st from 74 participants.

The women's doubles Final for the bowling event took place on 20 July at 8:00 (UTC−04:00), two Honduran athletes participated in this event finishing 19th from 70 participants.

The mixed doubles Final for the bowling event took place on 21 July at 8:00 (UTC−04:00), six Honduran athletes participated in this event finishing 31st, 43rd and 54th from 132 participants.

The women's trios Final for the bowling event took place on 22 July at 8:00 (UTC−04:00), three Honduran athletes participated in this event finishing 20th from 66 participants.

The men's trios Final for the bowling event took place on 22 July at 8:00 (UTC−04:00), three Honduran athletes participated in this event finishing 19th from 71 participants.

Diving

The men's 1M Springboard for the diving event took place on 20 July at 10:30 (UTC−04:00), one Honduran athlete participated in this event finishing 12th from 13 participants. and a 3M meet in which the diver tabled 8th out of 12 participants. Making this the first time any diver from Honduras participates internationally and stands between the first 12.

Fencing

The men's individual sabre for the fencing event took place on 20 July, one Honduran athlete participated in this event finishing 9th from 12 participants.

Judo

The women's -63 kg for the judo event took place on 19 July, one Honduran athlete participated in this event finishing 7th from 8 participants.

The men's -73 kg for the judo event took place on 19 July, one Honduran athlete participated in this event finishing 5th from 8 participants.

The men's -60 kg for the judo event took place on 20 July at 10:00 (UTC−04:00), one Honduran athlete participated in this event finishing 7th from 8 participants.

Racquetball

The women's Preliminary round singles for the racquetball event took place on 20 July at 10:00 (UTC−04:00), Pamela Sierra from Honduras faced Yira Portes from Dominican Republic.

The men's Preliminary round singles for the racquetball event took place on 20 July at 12:00 (UTC−04:00), Selvin Cruz from Honduras faced Adolfo Orellana from Costa Rica.

The men's Preliminary round doubles for the racquetball event took place on 20 July at 16:00 (UTC−04:00), Selvin Cruz and Raúl Banegas from Honduras faced Felipe Camacho and Teobaldo Fumero from Costa Rica.

The men's Preliminary round singles for the racquetball event took place on 21 July at 10:00 (UTC−04:00), Raúl Banegas from Honduras faced Simón Perdomo from Dominican Republic.

The men's Preliminary round singles for the racquetball event took place on 21 July at 10:42 (UTC−04:00), Selvin Cruz from Honduras faced Luis Pérez from Dominican Republic.

The women's Preliminary round singles for the racquetball event took place on 21 July at 13:30 (UTC−04:00), Pamela Sierra from Honduras faced Jessica Parrilla from Mexico.

Shooting

The men's qualification for 10M Air Pistol for the shooting event took place on 18 July at 12:30 (UTC−04:00), two Honduran athletes participated in this event finishing 19th and 25th from 32 participants.

The women's qualification for 10M Air Pistol for the shooting event took place on 18 July at 14:00 (UTC−04:00), one Honduran athlete participated in this event finishing 8th from 27 participants.

The men's qualification for 10M Air Rifle for the shooting event took place on 20 July at 14:30 (UTC−04:00), one Honduran athlete participated in this event finishing 19th from 23 participants.

The men's qualification for 50M Pistol for the shooting event took place on 21 July at 8:30 (UTC−04:00), two Honduran athletes participated in this event finishing 22nd from 27 participants.

Swimming

The Preliminary round for men's 100M Freestyle for the swimming event took place on 18 July at 9:02 (UTC−04:00), one Honduran athlete participated in this event finishing 1st from 6 participants.

The Preliminary round for men's 200M Butterfly for the swimming event took place on 18 July at 9:19 (UTC−04:00), two Honduran athletes participated in this event finishing 4th and 6th from 7 participants.

The Preliminary round for women's 200M Breaststroke for the swimming event took place on 18 July at 9:29 (UTC−04:00), one Honduran athlete participated in this event finishing 5th from 7 participants.

The Final round for men's 1500M Freestyle for the swimming event took place on 18 July at 9:35 (UTC−04:00), one Honduran athlete participated in this event finishing 4th from 4 participants.

The Preliminary round for women's 50M Butterfly for the swimming event took place on 19 July at 9:04 (UTC−04:00), two Honduran athletes participated in this event finishing 6th and 8th from 8 participants.

The Preliminary round for women's 50M Backstroke for the swimming event took place on 19 July at 9:18 (UTC−04:00), one Honduran athlete participated in this event finishing 8th from 8 participants.

The Preliminary round for women's 200M Individual medley for the swimming (Serie 1) event took place on 19 July at 9:34 (UTC−04:00), one Honduran athlete participated in this event finishing 4th from 6 participants.

The Preliminary round for women's 200M Individual medley for the swimming (Serie 3) event took place on 19 July at 9:38 (UTC−04:00), one Honduran athlete participated in this event finishing 7th from 7 participants.

The Final round for men's 4X200M Freestyle reply for the swimming event took place on 19 July at 19:21 (UTC−04:00), four Honduran athletes participated in this event finishing 4th from 20 participants.

The Preliminary round for men's 100M Butterfly for the swimming event (Serie 3) took place on 20 July at 9:04 (UTC−04:00), one Honduran athlete participated in this event finishing 6th from 7 participants.

The Preliminary round for men's 100M Butterfly for the swimming event (Serie 4) took place on 20 July at 9:06 (UTC−04:00), one Honduran athlete participated in this event finishing 6th from 8 participants.

The Preliminary round for women's 100M Breaststrokes for the swimming event took place on 20 July at 9:08 (UTC−04:00), one Honduran athlete participated in this event finishing 6th from 7 participants.

The Preliminary round for women's 100M Backstroke for the swimming event took place on 21 July at 9:02 (UTC−04:00), one Honduran athlete participated in this event finishing 5th from 7 participants.

The Preliminary round for women's 100M Butterfly for the swimming event took place on 21 July at 9:18 (UTC−04:00), two Honduran athletes participated in this event finishing 5th and 6th from 6 participants.

The Preliminary round for men's 4X100M Freestyle relay for the swimming event took place on 21 July at 9:37 (UTC−04:00), four Honduran athletes participated in this event finishing 6th from 24 participants.

Weightlifting

The men's 69 kg for the weightlifting event took place on 19 July, one Honduran athlete participated in this event finishing 11th from 11 participants.

The men's 77 kg for the weightlifting event took place on 20 July, one Honduran athlete participated in this event finishing 11th from 11 participants.

The men's 85 kg for the weightlifting event took place on 20 July, one Honduran athlete participated in this event finishing 5th from 7 participants.

References

External links

Nations at the 2010 Central American and Caribbean Games
2010
Central American and Caribbean Games